The Evergreen Cultural Centre is a community gathering place for performing and visual arts activities in Coquitlam, British Columbia, opened in October 1996 by former Coquitlam Mayor Lou Sekora. The design team was headed by Thom Weeks of Architectura, and the contract was completed by Proscenium Architecture.

The Centre features a 257-seat black box theatre (with configurable seating from stadium to flat floor), a fully equipped rehearsal hall, four art studios, and a  art gallery. The Centre is owned by the City of Coquitlam and operated by the Evergreen Cultural Centre Society, a nonprofit organization. Evergreen Cultural Centre is located in Coquitlam's Town Centre Park, overlooking Lafarge Lake.

Programming at the Evergreen Cultural Centre includes live theatre, comedy, musical concerts, family programming, visual arts workshops, gallery programs, and more. The facility serves as the home theatre for the Stage 43 Theatrical Society, and is also part of the Arts Club Theatre Company circuit that brings popular plays to the venue. The Centre is the home venue for the Pacific Symphonic Wind Ensemble and the Coastal Sound Music Academy.

A second 750-seat auditorium has been planned, but has yet to be funded.

References

External links
 Official site

Culture of Coquitlam
Buildings and structures in Coquitlam
Theatres in British Columbia
Art museums and galleries in British Columbia
Music venues in British Columbia